Bleomycin hydrolase is an enzyme that in humans is encoded by the BLMH gene.

Bleomycin hydrolase (BMH) is a cytoplasmic cysteine peptidase that is highly conserved through evolution. Its biological function is hydrolysis of the reactive electrophile homocysteine thiolactone. Another of its activities is metabolic inactivation of the glycopeptide bleomycin (BLM), an essential component of combination chemotherapy regimens for cancer. The protein contains the signature active site residues of the cysteine protease papain superfamily.

Interactions
BLMH has been shown to interact with RPL29, RPL11, UBE2I and Amyloid precursor protein.

References

External links

Further reading

EC 3.4.22